Jon Miller (born October 11, 1951) is an American sportscaster, known primarily for his broadcasts of Major League Baseball. Since 1997, he has been employed as a play-by-play announcer for the San Francisco Giants. He was also a baseball announcer for ESPN from 1990 to 2010. Miller received the Ford C. Frick Award from the National Baseball Hall of Fame in 2010.

Early life
Jon Miller was born on Hamilton Air Force Base in Novato, California, and grew up in Hayward, listening to Giants announcers Russ Hodges and Lon Simmons on the radio.  He attended his first baseball game in 1962, a 19–8 Giants' victory over the Los Angeles Dodgers at Candlestick Park.  As a teenager, Miller played Strat-O-Matic and recorded his own play-by-play into a tape recorder, adding his own crowd noise, vendors, and commercials.

Career

Early broadcasting work
After graduating from Hayward High School in 1969, Miller took broadcasting classes at the College of San Mateo.  He began his broadcasting career at the college's FM radio station (KCSM-FM) and UHF/PBS TV station (KCSM-TV), which reached much of the Bay Area.  His first baseball broadcasts were from CSM games.  At age 20, Miller joined KFTY-TV in Santa Rosa to work as their sports director. During this period, he would sit in the press box at Candlestick Park and record play-by-play of an entire game on his tape recorder.  Miller submitted one of these tapes to broadcaster Monte Moore, who helped Miller get his first baseball play-by play job in 1974, calling that year's World Series champion Oakland Athletics.  Miller was dismissed by the Athletics following the 1974 season.

For a brief period in the 1970s, Miller broadcast for the California Golden Seals of the National Hockey League. He also spent the early part of his career announcing San Francisco Dons and Pacific Tigers men's college basketball (1976–1980), the Golden State Warriors (part-time, 1979–1982) and Washington Bullets (part-time, 1984–1985) of the NBA, and the original San Jose Earthquakes of the North American Soccer League.  Jon Miller's first network exposure came in 1976, when he was selected by CBS-TV to broadcast the NASL Championship Game. From 1974–1976, Miller did play-by-play for the Washington Diplomats of the NASL. He also announced the Soccer Game of the Week for nationally syndicated TVS from 1977–1978.

Miller was hired by the Texas Rangers shortly before the 1978 season to replace the ill Dick Risenhoover after the Rangers were unable to lure Fred White from Kansas City.  After two seasons with Texas (1978–79), he was hired by the Boston Red Sox (1980–82). "The lure of doing baseball in Boston was too much to pass up," Miller recalled.

Baltimore Orioles
Following the Baltimore Orioles' 1982 season, their longtime announcer Chuck Thompson moved from the WFBR radio booth to do television broadcasts full-time, and  WFBR president Harry Shriver brought in Miller to handle the radio play-by-play duties with veteran broadcaster Tom Marr. In his first year in Baltimore, Miller called the Orioles' World Series championship run, including the last out of Game 5:

He eventually signed a contract directly with the Orioles and, while the broadcast rights eventually moved to rival station WBAL, Miller remained their primary announcer through 1996. At the end of that season, Orioles owner Peter Angelos, displeased with Miller's often candid commentary on the Orioles play, declined to renew his contract, citing a desire for a broadcaster who would "bleed more orange and black." Miller returned to the Bay Area and joined his hometown Giants.

San Francisco Giants
Since 1997, Miller has been the primary play-by-play voice of the San Francisco Giants (replacing Hank Greenwald), calling games on KNBR radio as well as KTVU (1997–2007) and KNTV (2008–2021) television. In February 2007, he signed a six-year extension to remain the voice of the Giants through the 2012 season.

On July 16, 2010, the Giants organization, including fellow broadcaster Dave Flemming, honored Miller at AT&T Park in a pregame ceremony about one week before Miller  received the Ford C. Frick Award.  Before the game started, Miller threw out the ceremonial first pitch.  On September 4, 2010, Miller called his first game for CSN Bay Area as a substitute for Dave Flemming, who was broadcasting a Stanford football game on the radio.

On May 27, 2003, during a game between the Giants and Arizona Diamondbacks, Miller called a play involving two defensive errors by the Diamondbacks and at least three separate baserunning mistakes by Giants outfielder Rubén Rivera. When Rivera was finally thrown out at home plate trying to score what would have been the winning run, Miller declared,  The phrase was repeated numerous times on sports radio and highlight shows such as SportsCenter, and quickly became one of the most famous calls of Miller's long career. He did a similar call on the radio during Game 3 of the 2004 World Series, when Jeff Suppan made a baserunning mistake.

On April 7, 2016, Miller accidentally called a grand slam by Hunter Pence for Buster Posey, but corrected himself mid-sentence:

Both Pence and Posey later referenced the call on their social media accounts, and Miller himself used the phrase intentionally a week later when Pence hit another home run.

Barry Bonds home run #756
On August 7, 2007, Miller made the call of Barry Bonds' record-breaking 756th home run on KNBR. His call of the historic home run will likely go down in history as the voice of the moment:

2014 World Series clincher
On October 29, 2014, Miller made the radio call on KNBR of the final out of the 2014 World Series, the Giants' third title in five years. His call also mentions the pitching performance of Madison Bumgarner through the playoffs. Miller's call went like this:

National baseball work
From 1986–1989, Miller did backup play-by-play for NBC's Saturday Game of the Week telecasts, paired with either Tony Kubek or Joe Garagiola. He also called regional telecasts for The Baseball Network in 1994–1995.

From 1990–2010, Miller did national television and radio broadcasts of regular-season and postseason games for ESPN, most prominently alongside Hall of Famer Joe Morgan on the network's Sunday Night Baseball telecasts.  Among his ESPN assignments, Miller called 13 World Series and 10 League Championship Series for ESPN Radio. During Game 3 of the 2000 World Series, Miller was forced to leave the booth after the top of the first inning due to an upper respiratory infection. Charley Steiner, serving as a field reporter for the network, filled in on play-by-play for the rest of the game; Miller resumed his duties in Game 4 of the Series. In November 2010, it was announced that Miller and Morgan would not be returning to the Sunday night telecasts for the 2011 season. Miller was offered, but declined, a continued role with ESPN Radio.

In May 2022, Miller teamed with Shawn Estes and Barry Larkin to call the national telecast of a Giants-Reds game for MLB Sunday Leadoff on Peacock, substituting for regular play-by-play announcer Jason Benetti.

Other appearances
Miller's voice can be heard in the Season 1 Cheers episode "The Tortelli Tort", during a scene where the gang at the bar is watching a Red Sox game on the television. He also is briefly heard in the films 61* and Summer Catch and in the English release of the animated movie My Neighbors the Yamadas, and appears as himself in two episodes of the HBO series Arliss.

In 1998, Miller wrote a book with Mark S. Hyman titled Confessions of a Baseball Purist: What's Right—and Wrong—with Baseball, as Seen from the Best Seat in the House, in which he expounded on the then-current state of the sport.

Miller guest-starred as Jordan in the episode "Little Octi Lost" of the 2016 reboot of the Cartoon Network original series The Powerpuff Girls.

Awards and honors
Miller received numerous honors for his ESPN work, including six CableACE Award nominations (winning the award in 1991 and 1996) and several Emmy Award nominations. The National Sportscasters and Sportswriters Association inducted him into its Hall of Fame in 1998, the Baseball Hall of Fame selected him for its Ford C. Frick Award in 2010, and the National Radio Hall of Fame inducted him in 2014. Miller was inducted into the Bay Area Radio Hall of Fame in 2010, with Dan Odum, his broadcasting professor from the College of San Mateo, serving as his presenter.

Commentating style
Miller's delivery is notable for his easygoing, sometimes humorous manner and measured use of hyperbole, particularly in banter with his sportscasting partners. He livens up many broadcasts with a few Hawaiian and Japanese phrases spoken with impeccable pronunciation, and has been known to announce a half inning totally in Spanish.  It is notable that Miller generally pronounces foreign language names with the source language pronunciation, in contrast with broadcasters who "Anglicize" foreign-named players. Miller is also known for his meticulous scorekeeping, having scored over 5,500 games since he started broadcasting.

Miller will occasionally quote lines from Shakespeare plays during radio broadcasts. He is well known for his foul ball call, "That ball is fooooul", and his emphatic cries of "Two!" for a successful double play and "Safe!" (which he pronounces like an umpire's "Hafe!" call) on close baserunning plays. Early in his career, Miller would punctuate home runs with the signature call, "Tell it goodbye!" (in emulation of longtime Giants announcer Lon Simmons), and he continues to refer to a home run as a "big fly". His home run call for Hispanic batters is now punctuated, "Adios, pelota!" (a phrase he occasionally uses for home runs hit by non-Hispanics as well).

Miller is noted in baseball circles for his impersonation of Los Angeles Dodgers announcer Vin Scully. Miller also imitates Harry Caray, Chuck Thompson, Jack Buck, Al Michaels, Babe Ruth, Bob Sheppard, and Harry Kalas, among others. Asked how he got into broadcasting play by play of baseball games, he recalled being in stands at Candlestick Park as a child and looking into the broadcast booth.  In the middle of the at-bat, he watched as the broadcaster consumed a handful of fries and a drink between pitches, thinking, "That is the life for me."

While calling games on the radio for the Giants, Miller occasionally introduces himself and his fellow broadcaster(s), followed by the phrase, "your Giants broadcasters". The same is repeated when Miller is on TV, except he replaces the word "broadcasters" with "telecasters." (Miller is referred to by fellow Giants broadcaster Mike Krukow as "The Big Kahuna".) He would use similar terminology for his Sunday Night Baseball telecasts on ESPN ("your Sunday night telecasters") and his World Series broadcasts for ESPN Radio ("your World Series broadcasters").

Personal life
Miller was involved in a seven-year marriage with Roberta Creeron in the 1970s, which produced two daughters.  In 1986, he re-united with childhood friend Janine Allen, who had also married and divorced and had one daughter.  The couple married in 1987 and have one son together.  They resided in Moss Beach, California for many years, before moving to an apartment near Oracle Park.  Jon's daughter Emilie Miller is an actress who appeared in a 2014 episode of Law & Order: Special Victims Unit.

References

External links
 Jon Miller Ford C. Frick Award biography at the National Baseball Hall of Fame
 

1951 births
Living people
American Basketball Association announcers
American impressionists (entertainers)
American radio sports announcers
American television sports announcers
Association football commentators
Baltimore Orioles announcers
Boston Red Sox announcers
California Golden Seals announcers
College basketball announcers in the United States
College football announcers
College of San Mateo alumni
Ford C. Frick Award recipients
Golden State Warriors announcers
Major Indoor Soccer League (1978–1992) commentators
Major League Baseball broadcasters
National Basketball Association broadcasters
National Hockey League broadcasters
North American Soccer League (1968–1984) commentators
Oakland Athletics announcers
Oakland Oaks
People from Hayward, California
People from Novato, California
San Francisco 49ers announcers
San Francisco Dons men's basketball announcers
San Francisco Giants announcers
Sportspeople from the San Francisco Bay Area
Texas Rangers (baseball) announcers
Washington Bullets announcers